Kiwa hirsuta is a crustacean discovered in 2005 in the South Pacific Ocean. Its discoverers dubbed it the "yeti lobster" or "yeti crab".

Identification
K. hirsuta was discovered in March 2005 by a group organized by Robert Vrijenhoek of the Monterey Bay Aquarium Research Institute in Monterey, California and Michel Segonzac of the Ifremer and a Census of Marine Life scientist using the submarine DSV Alvin, operating from RV Atlantis. The discovery was announced on 7 March 2006. Based on both morphology and molecular data, the organism was deemed to form a new biological family (Kiwaidae); a second species, Kiwa puravida, was discovered in 2006 and described in 2011. Yeti Crabs live in hydrothermal vents, which are deep within the ocean. These vents provide hot water which makes up the environment where these crabs live. The crabs regulate their ecosystem by using their hairy arms to collect toxins released from the hydrothermal vents.

Characteristics
The animal has strongly reduced eyes that lack pigment, and is thought to be blind. The "hairy" pincers contain filamentous bacteria, which the creature may use to detoxify poisonous minerals from the water emitted by the hydrothermal vents where it lives. This process is known as chemosynthesis. Lipid and isotope analyses provide evidence that epibiotic bacteria are the crab's main food source and K. puravida has highly modified setae (hairs) on its 3rd maxilliped (a mouth appendage) which it uses to harvest these bacteria. Yeti crabs receive most of their essential nutrients from chemosynthetic episymbiotic bacteria which grows on hairlike setae. This chemosynthetic episymbiotic bacteria can be found growing from numerous areas of their ventral surface as well as their appendages. The ε- and γ- proteobacteria that this methane-seep species farms are closely related to hydrothermal-vent decapod epibionts. Alternatively, it may be a carnivore, although it is generally thought to feed on bacteria.

Although it is often referred to as the "furry lobster" outside the scientific literature, Kiwa hirsuta is a squat lobster, more closely related to crabs and hermit crabs than true lobsters. The term "furry lobster" is more commonly used for the family Synaxidae.

Etymology
Macpherson et al. named the genus Kiwa after "the god(dess) of the shellfish in the Polynesian mythology".  is Latin for "hairy".

References

Further reading

External links
.

Squat lobsters
Animals living on hydrothermal vents
Crustaceans of the eastern Pacific Ocean
Crustaceans described in 2006